Whisker Haven Tales with the Palace Pets (also known as Whisker Haven Tales or simply Whisker Haven) is an American animated short series animated and produced by Ghostbot Studios and Disney Publishing. It is based on Disney's Palace Pets toyline, which in turn, is a spinoff of the Disney Princess franchise. The series is directed by Alan Lau and written by Shea Fontana. The series launched on the Disney Junior watch app and then aired on Disney Junior. The animated shorts are now available through the accompanying app, “Palace Pets in Whisker Haven” which also includes activities and games featuring the Palace Pets.

Plot
Whisker Haven Tales with the Palace Pets is a series starring a core group of six palace pets: Treasure, Pumpkin, Petite, Sultan, Dreamy and Berry along with the caretaker fairy hummingbird Miss Featherbon. These Palace Pets enter magical portals from their respective Princess Kingdoms and travel to the animal kingdom of Whisker Haven. In this new magical world, the Palace Pets go on fun-filled adventures and learn to value friendship, kindness and loyalty. From putting on a dance show to throwing the biggest ball, there's no task too big, too small, or too glamorous for the Palace Pets.

Characters

Main
Berry (voiced by Emma Salzman in Season 1, Grace Kaufman for subsequent seasons) – A pale azure bunny who belongs to Snow White.
Pumpkin (voiced by Bailey Gambertoglio) – A white puppy with a passion for ballet who belongs to Cinderella.
Dreamy (voiced by Myla Beau) – A pink kitten. As her name suggests, like her owner Aurora, she is often sleepy.
Treasure (voiced by Sanai Victoria) – A scarlet kitten who belongs to Ariel.
Petite (voiced by Natalie Coughlin) – A bookish tan pony who belongs to Belle.
Sultan (voiced by Henry Kaufman) – A confident orange tiger cub who belongs to Jasmine, and one of five male characters from the series.
Miss Featherbon (voiced by Anne Halli) – A blue hummingbird with magical powers. She sometimes offers advice to the Palace Pets, and even serve as a host in some events. She was not in the Palace Pets in Whisker Haven app.

Supporting
Lily (voiced by Darielle Stewart) – A pale lavender kitten who belongs to Tiana.
Bibbidy (voiced by Riley Go) – A perfection-loving white pony who is Cinderella's pet.
Sweetie (voiced by Alexandra Peters) – A pale blue pony who specializes in speed for horse racing events and belongs to Snow White.
Nuzzles (voiced by Breanna Brooks) – A shy but sneaky orange-and-gold fox who belongs to Aurora. According to the episode "Hearts! Hooves! Eggs!", she likes eggs.
Mr. Chow (voiced by Jeff Bennett) – A kitten who runs the feed store.
Lucy (voiced by Ashleigh Ball) – A puppy who runs the Squeaking Ball Shop.
Tillie (voiced by Erin Fitzgerald) – A kitten who runs Tutu Tailor.
Taj (voiced by Gabe Eggerling) – A lavender young elephant who belongs to Jasmine, and another male character.
Daisy (voiced by Kallan Holley) – A calm and curious Maltese who belongs to Rapunzel.
Windflower (voiced by Mila Brener) – An aquamarine raccoon who belongs to Pocahontas.
Pounce (voiced by Lyons Mathias) – An cute, amber-and-gold bobcat who belongs to Pocahontas. He is male too.
Fern (voiced by Fiona Bishop) – A rarely seen pink owl who likes to solve mysteries.
Barnaby Pickles – A Tabby who likes to tell jokes.
Pierre the Fish – Barnaby Pickles' French best friend.
Nyle (voiced by Carter Sand) – A naughty teal monkey who is Jasmine's pet. He is also a male.
Gleam (voiced by Katherine Forrester) – A tan-colored fawn with a sense of direction. And like Truffles and Daisy, she is Rapunzel's.
Truffles (voiced by Cassidy May Benullo) – A clean and perfumed pink piggy who is Rapunzel's pet.
Teacup (voiced by Hadley Belle Miller) – A singing gold Cavalier King Charles Spaniel who is Belle's pet.
Bloom (voiced by Eva Bella) – A happy light pink pony who belongs to Aurora.
Brie (voiced by Hannah Swain) – A pale blue mouse who belongs to Cinderella.
Jane Hair – Jane Hair is a cat who owns a Hair Salon.
Slipper (voiced by Gracie Grenier) – A chubby pale blue Persian kitten who enjoys putting quartzes on things. She belongs to Cinderella.
Matey (voiced by Dani Dare) – A lavender Border Collie who belongs to Ariel. He is also a male.
Waddles (voiced by Livvy Stubenrauch) – A light purple puffin who belongs to Ariel.
Sandstorm (voiced by Katie Silverman) – An orange and pale yellow cheetah who belongs to Jasmine.
Chai (voiced by Issac Ryan Brown) – A pink red panda who belongs to Mulan.
River (voiced by Kate Higgins) – A cute little teal wolf pup who belongs to Pocahontas.
Otto (voiced by Evan Kishiyama) – A light cyan sea otter who belongs to Ariel.
Ash (voiced by Isabella Crovetti) – Slipper's best friend, a cute pink and purple baby dragon who belongs to Aurora.
Page (voiced by Katherine Dillon) – A cute fluffy lamb who belongs to Belle.
Chipper (voiced by Abigail Zoe Lewis) – A red squirrel who drives a camper. She belongs to Aurora.

Episodes

Series overview

Season 1 (2015)

Season 2 (2016)

Season 3 (2017)
By this period, episode lengths have been reduced from 3  minutes to just 2 minutes.

Controversy
Palace Pets in Whisker Haven was named among several Disney mobile apps named in a class action lawsuit which alleged that Disney and three other software companies "secretly [collect] personal information on some of their youngest customers and [share] that data illegally with advertisers without parental consent".

References

External links

Official Website

Disney Channel original programming
Disney animated television series
American animated short films
2015 American television series debuts
2017 American television series endings
2010s American animated television series
American children's animated adventure television series
American children's animated fantasy television series
American preschool education television series
Animated preschool education television series
2010s preschool education television series
Animated television series about animals
Television series by Disney
English-language television shows